Botifarra is a point trick-taking card game for four players in fixed partnerships played in Catalonia, in the northeast of Spain, and parts of Aragon, the Balearic Islands and North of the Valencian Country. It is a historical game also played in many parts of Spain, not only in bars and coffee shops. The game is closely related to Manille from which it takes the mechanics, but its rules induce deduction and minimise the effects of luck.

Object
Botifarra is a point trick card game in which the points in the tricks are most important, rather than the number of tricks, although a trick also has a value by itself. The game is usually played for 101 points or more, and this requires several hands.

Point card values
The point value of each card is as follows:

 9 (Manille) = 5 points 
 Ace         = 4 points 
 King (12)   = 3 points 
 Knight (11) = 2 points 
 Jack (10)   = 1 point 
 Pip cards   = 0

In addition to the points for cards listed above, one point is added for every trick won.

The game

Botifarra is played with a Spanish 48-card deck whose suits are Coins, Cups, Swords and Batons running from 1 to 12. The card order is 9 (high), Ace, King, Horse, Jack, 8, 7, 6, 5, 4, 3, 2 (low). The dealer deals the whole deck counterclockwise in batches of four cards. After each hand the turn to deal and play always passes to the right. Usually, dealer's right hand opponent shuffles the deck and the left hand opponent cuts.

The trump suit or Botifarra (No trump - NT) is either chosen by the dealer or he may pass the privilege to his partner. If the dealer passes, the partner must choose a suit or No trumps, for he cannot pass the right to choose. 

After the trump suit or Botifarra is selected, either of the defenders can double (Contrar) the hand if they want to, and if doubled, either of the members of the dealer's team can redouble (Recontrar) the hand. If redoubled, the defenders can re-redouble (Sant Vicens) the contract. 

When the game played is Botifarra, the score may be doubled, and Contrar, Recontrar and Sant Vicens can double it further, so that there could be up to 4 doubles in the game. So, the order in which the players have the opportunity to double is: 
 
Contro - the partnership that didn't make the trump choice can say "contro", doubling the score or quadrupling it if the game chosen was botifarra) 
Recontro - if the hand has been "contrada", the partnership that selected trumps can say "recontro", which will quadruple the final score.
Sant Vicens - this option only can be used by those who said "contro", if the opponents say "recontro" and botifarra was not chosen.

The play
The player to the right of the dealer leads first, known as "palo de salida". Any card may be played, and suit must be followed if possible, otherwise, trump must be played if possible, otherwise any card may be played. The winner of each trick then leads to the next. The tricks are stored face down in front of one of the members of each team, and they can not be consulted, except for the last trick played. Each trick is won by the highest trump played or, if no trump is played, by the highest card played of the suit led, or if a no-trump contract is played, by the highest card of the suit led.

Scoring points
The points scored by each partnership are counted and the team who won the hand will then record the corresponding number of points. The player who dealt the cards and selected trumps in the previous hand will be responsible for shuffling the cards, the player to his left will cut the deck and the player to his right will deal the cards and select trumps. 

In some versions of the game, the cards are never shuffled at the start of each hand. The two piles of cards from the previous hand are simply placed on top of each other and the deck is cut by the next player in order of play. This means that the cards will be distributed in such a way that the probability of acquiring a singular hand will be high.

Penalties
A revoke is penalised by the loss of all the points won so far during the play. The opponents score 36 points in the case of a normal hand and 72 in a botifarra (NT) hand.

A misdeal leads to the start of a new hand, but is not penalised with any points. The player to the right of the person who misdealt then deals and makes the trump choice, thus making the initial dealer lose out on the option of selecting trumps himself.

Etiquette
When playing Botifarra you must also bear in mind that it is forbidden to speak, show your cards or make signs or comments that may reveal your cards or your opinion as to whether game decisions are good or bad. Despite this, it is quite normal to make some comments during the game, which adds to a more entertaining atmosphere.

See also
Truco
Mus (card game)

References

External links
Botifarra Rules at Pagat.com

Manille group
Spanish card games
Catalan culture
Year of introduction missing
Spanish deck card games